The Palais de Glace d'Anvers (Ijspaleis Antwerpen) was a sports venue located in Antwerp, Belgium. The building was demolished in 2016.

Later the building was converted for commercial purposes. It served, among other things, as a Renault garage, as a storage place for the vehicles of the Antwerp Taxi Maatschappij and as a parking garage under the name Garage Leopold. In 2016, the building was demolished for the construction of new apartment buildings. With it, one of the last physical relics of the 1920 Olympics disappeared.

References
MTRMedia.com History of Olympic ice hockey.
Sports-reference.com profile of Figure skating at the 1920 Summer Olympics.
Sports-reference.com profile of the men's Ice Hockey at the 1920 Summer Olympics.

Buildings and structures in Antwerp
Defunct sports venues in Belgium
Demolished buildings and structures in Belgium
Ice hockey in Belgium
Indoor arenas in Belgium
Indoor ice hockey venues
Olympic figure skating venues
Olympic ice hockey venues
Sports venues demolished in 2016
Sports venues in Antwerp Province
Venues of the 1920 Summer Olympics
Defunct indoor arenas